The Phineas Priesthood, also called Phineas Priests, are American domestic terrorists who adhere to the ideology which was set forth in the 1990 book Vigilantes of Christendom: The Story of the Phineas Priesthood by Richard Kelly Hoskins. 

The Phineas Priests are not an organization, and it has no discernible leadership or institutional structure. For ideological adherents, a "Phineas Priest" is someone who commits a "Phineas action" – menaing the person follows the example of Phineas, a Hebrew man who was rewarded for killing an interfaith couple by God, according to the Old Testament. The term "Phineas action" is broadly used by white supremacists, as a term for murders of interracial couples and as a term for attacks on Jewish people, members of other non-white ethnic groups, "multiculturalists," and anyone else who they consider their enemy.

Ideology and activities
The ideology which is set forth in Hoskins' book includes Christian Identity beliefs which oppose interracial relationships, the mixing of races, homosexuality, and abortion. It also is marked by anti-Semitism and anti-multiculturalism.

According to the Anti-Defamation League (ADL), "Many people mistakenly believe that there is an actual organization called the Phineas Priesthood, probably because there was a group of four men in the 1990s who called themselves Phineas Priests. The men carried out bank robberies and a series of bombings in the Pacific Northwest before being sent to prison. But there is no evidence that their organization was any larger than those four individuals."

The Phineas Priesthood is not considered an organization because it is not led by a governing body, its members do not hold gatherings, and it does not have a membership process. One simply becomes a Phineas Priest by adopting the Priesthood's beliefs and acting upon them. Adherents of the Phineas Priesthood ideology are considered terrorists because, among other things, their crimes include numerous abortion clinic bombings in 1996, the 1996 bombing of The Spokesman-Review newspaper in Spokane, Washington bank robberies, and plans to blow up FBI buildings. Four men who professed to follow the "religious philosophy of Phineas priests" were convicted of crimes that included bank robberies and bombings, and each of them was (initially) sentenced to life in prison in 1997 and 1998. 

Hoskins' book was found in a van that was driven by Buford Furrow when he killed one person and wounded five others in an attack on a Jewish Community Center in California in 1999. In 2012, Drew Bostwick renamed a splinter faction of the neo-Nazi group Aryan Nations the "Tabernacle of the Phineas Priesthood-Aryan Nations" when he replaced August Kreis as the group's leader.

On November 28, 2014, 49-year-old Larry Steven McQuilliams fired more than 100 rounds at a federal courthouse, a Mexican consulate building (which he also tried to set on fire), and a police station in Austin, Texas; he was killed by return fire from police. A copy of Hoskins' book was found in McQuilliams' home.

Name
The Phineas Priesthood is named after the Israelite Phineas, grandson of Aaron. According to Numbers 25, Phineas personally executed an Israelite man and a Midianite woman while they were together in the man's tent, ending a plague which had been sent by God in order to punish the Israelites for intermingling both sexually and religiously with Baal-worshipers. Phineas is commended for having stopped Israel's fall into idolatrous practices that were introduced to it by Moabite women. God commends Phineas as zealous through Moses, gives him a "covenant of peace," and grants him and "his seed" an everlasting priesthood. This passage was cited in Hoskins' book as a justification for using violent means against people who have interracial relationships and practice other forms of alleged immorality.

See also
 Antisemitism in Christianity
 The Bible and violence
 Christianity and violence
 Christian terrorism
 Byron De La Beckwith, the assassin of NAACP and Civil rights movement leader Medgar Evers became a Phineas Priest
 Larry Gene Ashbrook, a mass murderer who allegedly was a self-professed Phineas Priest
 Far-right subcultures
 Groups claiming affiliation with Israelites
 List of Christian denominations#Christian Identitist
 List of Christian movements#Religious
 List of fascist movements
 List of Ku Klux Klan organizations
 List of neo-Nazi organizations
 List of organizations designated by the Southern Poverty Law Center as hate groups#Christian Identity
 List of white nationalist organizations

References

External links
The Order and Phineas Priesthood by the Anti-Defamation League
Overview by the Southern Poverty Law Center
Anthony Rees, [Re]Reading Again:  A Mosaic Reading of Numbers 25, A thesis submitted to Charles Sturt University for a PhD, 2013. Chapter "A Violent Turn. The Phinehas Priesthood" (p. 126ff). Accessed 15 August 2018

Christian organizations established in 1990
American bank robbers
Christian Identity
Christianity and antisemitism
Christianity and race
Christian advocacy groups
Neo-Nazi concepts
Christian new religious movements
Religiously motivated violence in the United States
Terrorism in the United States
Neo-Nazism in the United States